Seli-Nurme is a village in Rapla Parish, Rapla County in northwestern Estonia.

References

 

Villages in Rapla County